Thauera aromatica is a species of bacteria. Its type strain is K 172T.

References

Further reading

External links

Type strain of Thauera aromatica at BacDive -  the Bacterial Diversity Metadatabase

Rhodocyclaceae
Bacteria described in 1995